Wyndford is an area of the city of Glasgow, Scotland. The area comprises council housing that is typical of that which was built throughout Glasgow in the 1960s and 1970s. The houses are now either privately owned or mainly run by Cube housing association. The community is represented by the Wyndford Tenants Union.

It is built on the site of the former Glasgow city barracks, hence many local people colloquially refer to the area as "the Barracks".  These barracks were built in 1872 when the Glasgow barracks were moved from the city's east end to this site, despite the fact that Maryhill was technically not part of the city at the time, as it was then a politically independent burgh. It was home to the Highland Light Infantry. After the barracks closed in 1960, the site was chosen for the Wyndford housing scheme (the Glaswegian term for housing estate). The former barrack's walls and gatehouse are still in place, and they form a perimeter around the Wyndford estate. The nearby Walcheren Barracks maintains a vestigial link to the Army in the area.

Footballers Charlie Nicholas and Jim Duffy are both originally from the Wyndford area.

It was an area of support for the Glasgow school closures protest, 2009.

See also
 Glasgow tower blocks
 List of tallest buildings and structures in Glasgow

References

External links

Wyndford: Housing, Everyday Life & Wellbeing over the long term, project by University of Glasgow

Housing estates in Glasgow
Areas of Glasgow
Maryhill